Dosinia concentrica, common name the West Indian dosinia, is a species of saltwater clam, a marine bivalve mollusc in the family Veneridae. This species is found in Caribbean waters, ranging from the West Indies to Brazil.

References

Dosinia
Bivalves described in 1778